Republic Township is a civil township of Marquette County in  the U.S. state of Michigan. The population was 994 at the 2020 census. The unincorporated community of Republic is located within the township.

Geography

Communities
South Republic is an unincorporated community in the township
Witch Lake is an unincorporated community in the township

Demographics
As of the census of 2000, there were 1,106 people, 493 households, and 347 families residing in the township.  The population density was 9.8 per square mile (3.8/km).  There were 983 housing units at an average density of 8.7 per square mile (3.4/km).  The racial makeup of the township was 97.20% White, 1.81% Native American, 0.45% from other races, and 0.54% from two or more races. Hispanic or Latino of any race were 0.09% of the population.

There were 493 households, out of which 22.1% had children under the age of 18 living with them, 58.2% were married couples living together, 7.3% had a female householder with no husband present, and 29.6% were non-families. 25.8% of all households were made up of individuals, and 12.8% had someone living alone who was 65 years of age or older.  The average household size was 2.23 and the average family size was 2.63.

In the township the population was spread out, with 19.0% under the age of 18, 4.2% from 18 to 24, 22.6% from 25 to 44, 31.2% from 45 to 64, and 23.1% who were 65 years of age or older.  The median age was 48 years. For every 100 females, there were 106.0 males.  For every 100 females age 18 and over, there were 104.6 males.

The median income for a household in the township was $27,500, and the median income for a family was $33,472. Males had a median income of $27,813 versus $19,375 for females. The per capita income for the township was $15,524.  About 6.9% of families and 11.2% of the population were below the poverty line, including 12.7% of those under age 18 and 11.1% of those age 65 or over.

History
Old M-95 – Michigamme River Bridge was listed on the National Register of Historic Places in 1999. Built in 1910, and modest in scale and design, it is technologically and historically significant as an embodiment of local bridge design before state standardization. It spans the Michigamme River on an abandoned roadway (now used as a private road) that was once M-95, immediately west of the current highway.

References

Townships in Marquette County, Michigan
Townships in Michigan